"Across The Border" is the third single released by the Japanese band Vivid. This was released in three different versions: a limited CD+DVD edition, a limited CD only edition, and a regular CD only edition. Limited edition A came with a DVD of the title song's PV, while limited edition B came with a 16-page booklet and the B-side track "feast of the moon". The regular edition came with the B-side track "Twilight". The limited editions have only 3,000 copies each. The single reached number 22 on the Oricon weekly charts, where it charted for three weeks, selling 5,958 copies.

Track listing

2010 singles
Vivid (band) songs
2010 songs